The 1900 All England Championships was the second annual badminton tournament held at the Scottish Drill Hall, the headquarters of the London Scottish Rifles at Buckingham Gate, Westminster, London, England from 18–19 April 1900.

Final results

Men's singles

Women's singles

Men's doubles

Women's doubles

Mixed doubles

References

All England Open Badminton Championships
All England
All England Open Badminton Championships in London
All Championships
All England Badminton Championships